Surin Upatkoon (劉錦坤) is a Thai billionaire. He made his fortune in a diversified range of industries, from telecom to lotteries. Most derives from his realized stake in Intouch Holdings. He started his business career in 1971 at a weaving firm. He graduated from Han Chiang High School. He resides primarily in Kuala Lumpur.

References

Surin Upatkoon
Living people
Year of birth uncertain
Malaysian people of Thai descent
Place of birth missing (living people)
People from Kuala Lumpur
Year of birth missing (living people)